Terzo Mondo is a 2000 studio album by the Leningrad Cowboys.

Track listing

Singles

"Mardi Gras Ska"
1999 saw the release of "Mardi Gras Ska" as a single in Finland

CD Megamania/ 1000 128332 (Finland)
"Mardi Gras Ska"
"Happy Being Miserable"
"Nolo Tengo"

"Happy Being Miserable"
"Happy Being Miserable" was released as a single in Finland and the Netherlands in 2000.

Track listings

CD Johanna Kustannus/ 1000 131132 (Finland)
"Happy Being Miserable" – 3:38
"Back To Moscow" – 2:37

CD Roadrunner Records/ RR 2102-2 (The Netherlands)
"Happy Being Miserable" – 3:38
"Back To Moscow" – 2:37

CD Roadrunner Records/ RR 2102-3 (The Netherlands)
"Happy Being Miserable" – 3:38
"Mardi Gras Ska" – 2:44
"Back To Moscow" – 2:37

Leningrad Cowboys
In 2000 Johanna Kustannus released a two track remix single titled simply Leningrad Cowboys.  The Remixes were done by Sound Freaks.

CD Johanna Kustannus/ 1000 133532  (Finland)
"Monkey Groove" – 3:16
"Harem" – 3:16

Personnel
The Leningrad Cowboys:
Twist Twist Erkinharju - drums
Tipe Johnson - vocals
Sakke Järvenpää - vocals
Vesa Kääpä - guitar
Pemo Ojala - trumpet
Ykä Putkinen - guitar
Silu Seppälä - bass
Antti Snellman - saxophone
Mauri Sumén - keyboards

The Leningrad Ladies:
Mari Hatakka - Go-Go and vocals
Tiina Isohanni - Go-Go and vocals

Additional musicians:
Paavo Maijanen - backing vocals and bas on "I Hate You" intro/outro
T.T. Oksala - loops and samples
Heikki Kangasniemi - fiddle on "Emerald Blues"
Tatu Kemppainen - guitar and mandolin on "Emerald Blues"
Kurt Lindblad - tin whistle on "Emerald Blues" and "Bumpersticker Rock"
Puka Oinonen - saw on "Lumberjack Lady"
Mika Salo - guitar solo on "Mardi Gras Ska"
Julle Ekblad - backing vocals on "There's Someone Smiling Down on Me"

References

2000 albums
Leningrad Cowboys albums